John Alan Blinston (born 15 June 1944) is a British former long-distance runner. He competed in the 1968 Summer Olympics and was a bronze medallist in the 5000 metres at the 1969 European Athletics Championships.

He was also a team silver medallist at the 1975 IAAF World Cross Country Championships. He was a three-time runner-up in the 5000 m at the AAA Championships, in 1969, 1970, and 1971.  Blinston has 8 career wins.

References

1944 births
Living people
English male long-distance runners
Olympic athletes of Great Britain
Athletes (track and field) at the 1968 Summer Olympics
European Athletics Championships medalists
People from Altrincham
Sportspeople from Greater Manchester